Cryptocephalus moraei is a species of beetle from the genus Cryptocephalus. The species was originally described by Carl Linnaeus in 1758.

Description 
This leaf beetle is 3 to 5 mm in size. The front parts of the antenna are bicoloured black-brown, but turns fully black. The head of the males are yellow, while the females have a black head with two yellow dots. The Prothorax is black with a yellow smudge against the rear corners. The Elytra contain rows with robust points, mostly black but again with a yellow stain at the end. The legs are reddish-brown. The species can be observed from May to August and feeds on species from the Hypericum genus.

Range 
Cryptocephalus moraei has been recorded across Europe, both in scholarly articles and citizen science efforts.

References

Taxa named by Carl Linnaeus
moraei